Ebun Oloyede popularly known as Olaiya Igwe  is a veteran Nollywood actor, producer and director who is known for the production of Iru Esin, Alase Aye and  Abela Pupa.

Biography 
Olaiya is a native of Ogun State and in 2022, He graduated from Crescent University, Abeokuta, Nigeria.

Career 
Olaiya Igwe has spent more than forty years in the movie industry, he has featured in over one hundred movies and produced over twenty movies.

Filmography 

 Iru Esin
 Kosi Tabi Sugbon
 Abela Pupa
 Baale Oko Ilu
 Awon Aladun De (TV series)
 Ile Alayo

References 

Living people
Yoruba male actors
Yoruba filmmakers
Nigerian film directors
Nigerian male film actors
Nigerian film producers
Year of birth missing (living people)